The R482 road is a regional road in Ireland. It is a loop road from the N67 in County Clare. The road is part of the Wild Atlantic Way.

The R482 travels southwest from the N67 to Spanish Point. After Spanish Point, the road turns south before rejoining the N67.

References

Regional roads in the Republic of Ireland
Roads in County Clare